Pearl is a 1978 radio play by award-winning English playwright John Arden.  Set in England in the 1640s, the play concerns a young Irish political operative named Pearl, who, with playwright Tom Backhouse, attempts to sway the political climate in favour of the British Parliament, as part of a plan to achieve Irish sovereignty.

Production
Pearl was produced and broadcast on BBC Radio 4 on 3 July 1978, with the following cast:

Pearl - Elizabeth Bell
Mother Bumroll - Paula Tilbrook
Barnabas/Male Voice - David Mahlowe
Stage Manager/Casca/Actor - John Jardine
Grip - Geoffrey Banks
Sowse/Caesar - Ronald Herdman
Grimscar/1st Commoner - Peter Jeffrey
Backhouse/Soothsayer - David Calder
Belladonna - Lynda Marchal
Duchess - Kathleen Helme
Catso/Marullus - Kenneth Alan Taylor
Katerina/Female Voice - Jane Knowles
Messenger/Flavius/Actor - Robert Morton
Music composed and conducted by Stephen Boxer
Musicians Ephraim Segerman and members of the Northern Renaissance Consort
Produced by Alfred Bradley

Critical reception
The play won a Giles Cooper Award in 1978, and is considered one of the finest examples of the medium.

Publication
Hardcover and Paperback editions were published by Eyre Methuen in 1979.

References

British radio dramas
1978 plays